Tân Tạo University  is a private non-profit university in Long An Province, Vietnam. The founder and the main sponsor of TTU is Mme Dang Thi Hoang Yen. Tân Tạo is the university using the model of Duke University, USA and aspires to become the first Vietnamese university with a U.S.-style education. Programs at TTU are taught in English.

Location and construction

Tân Tạo University is situated on a 503-acre area in Tan Duc E.City, Đức Hòa District, Long An Province. The university is designed and master planned by architectural firms from the United States.

The campus construction is expected to be completed within 15 years. The university's new facilities will have the capacity to serve ten thousand students and includes ten schools with sixty-four faculty buildings in a total area of 12 million square feet and a centrally located library.

Academic program

Tân Tạo University offered the following undergraduate programs for the 2014–2015 school year:

Students at TTU will begin with U-PREP, a University Preparatory Semester. They will concentrate on the development of English and soft skills, including study skills and preparation for university-level classroom assignments. Full scholarships are available for U-PREP.

Academic programs in the university will normally require 120 units of credit or about four years of academic work.

References 
 

Universities in Vietnam